Valeria Simakova (born 4 December 1990, in Moscow, Soviet Union) is a Russian pair skater. With partner Anton Tokarev, she won the 2005 Junior Grand Prix Final.

External links

Navigation

Russian female pair skaters
1990 births
Living people
Figure skaters from Moscow